Marlon da Silva de Moura (born 5 February 1990, in Belford Roxo) is a Brazilian football player who currently plays as a forward.

Career

Club career
On 22 April 2020 it was confirmed, that Marlon would join Águila in El Salvador in the summer 2020.

References 

1. Pemain Pemain asing baru Mitra Kukar, Marlon da Silva

External links

Marlon da Silva at ZeroZero

1990 births
Living people
Brazilian footballers
Brazilian expatriate footballers
Association football forwards
Duque de Caxias Futebol Clube players
Boavista Sport Club players
Bonsucesso Futebol Clube players
Ipatinga Futebol Clube players
Resende Futebol Clube players
Mitra Kukar players
Persiba Balikpapan players
Borneo F.C. players
Alki Oroklini players
Marlon da Silva
Palmas Futebol e Regatas players
C.D. Águila footballers
Campeonato Brasileiro Série C players
Campeonato Brasileiro Série D players
Liga 2 (Indonesia) players
Liga 1 (Indonesia) players
Cypriot First Division players
Brazilian expatriate sportspeople in Indonesia
Brazilian expatriate sportspeople in Cyprus
Brazilian expatriate sportspeople in Thailand
Brazilian expatriate sportspeople in El Salvador
Expatriate footballers in Indonesia
Expatriate footballers in Cyprus
Expatriate footballers in Thailand
Expatriate footballers in El Salvador
People from Bedford Roxo